Orthogonius nigripes is a species of ground beetle in the subfamily Orthogoniinae. It was described by Tian & Deuve in 2001.

References

nigripes
Beetles described in 2001